Johannes Wennecker also Johannes Wennecker der Ältere (died 1469) was a Roman Catholic prelate who served as Auxiliary Bishop of Münster (1454–1469).

He was ordained a priest in the Order of Saint Augustine. In 1454, he was appointed during the papacy of Pope Nicholas V as Auxiliary Bishop of Münster and Titular Bishop of Larissa in Syria. He served as Auxiliary Bishop of Münster until his death in 1469.

See also 
Catholic Church in Germany

References 

15th-century German Roman Catholic bishops
Bishops appointed by Pope Nicholas V
1469 deaths
Augustinian bishops